Conus gladiator, common name the gladiator cone, is a species of sea snail, a marine gastropod mollusk in the family Conidae, the cone snails and their allies.

Like all species within the genus Conus, these snails are predatory and venomous. They are capable of "stinging" humans, therefore live ones should be handled carefully or not at all.

Description
The size of an adult shell varies between 26 mm and 48 mm. The spire is rather depressed, tuberculate and striate. The color of the shell is chocolate-brown, variegated with white, disposed in longitudinal streaks, with an irregular white band, and more or less distinct revolving lines of darker brown. The interior is white or tinged with chocolate. The epidermis is fibrous.

Distribution
This species occurs in the Pacific Ocean off the Galapagos Islands and from the Gulf of California to Peru.

References

 Filmer R.M. (2001). A Catalogue of Nomenclature and Taxonomy in the Living Conidae 1758 – 1998. Backhuys Publishers, Leiden. 388pp.
 Tucker J.K. (2009). Recent cone species database. 4 September 2009 Edition
 Tucker J.K. & Tenorio M.J. (2009) Systematic classification of Recent and fossil conoidean gastropods. Hackenheim: Conchbooks. 296 pp
 Puillandre N., Duda T.F., Meyer C., Olivera B.M. & Bouchet P. (2015). One, four or 100 genera? A new classification of the cone snails. Journal of Molluscan Studies. 81: 1–23

External links
 Kiener L.C. 1844–1850. Spécies général et iconographie des coquilles vivantes. Vol. 2. Famille des Enroulées. Genre Cone (Conus, Lam.), pp. 1–379, pl. 1-111 [pp. 1–48 (1846); 49–160 (1847); 161–192 (1848); 193–240 (1849); 241-[379](assumed to be 1850); plates 4,6 (1844); 2–3, 5, 7–32, 34–36, 38, 40–50 (1845); 33, 37, 39, 51–52, 54–56, 57–68, 74–77 (1846); 1, 69–73, 78–103 (1847); 104–106 (1848); 107 (1849); 108–111 (1850)]. Paris, Rousseau & J.B. Baillière
 The Conus Biodiversity website
 
 Cone Shells – Knights of the Sea

Gallery

gladiator
Gastropods described in 1833